Hell or High Water is a 2016 American neo-Western heist-crime film directed by David Mackenzie and written by Taylor Sheridan. Starring Chris Pine, Ben Foster and Jeff Bridges, the film follows two brothers who carry out a series of bank robberies to save their family farm. The film premiered at the Cannes Film Festival on May 16, 2016, and began a limited release on August 12, 2016, in the United States, followed by a wide release on August 26. The film was released to universal acclaim, with Rotten Tomatoes gave an approval rating of 98% based on 240 reviews, with an average rating of 8.5/10 and Metacritic gave a score of 88 out of 100, based on 47 reviews.

Hell or High Water received four nominations at Academy Awards, including Best Picture, Best Supporting Actor for Bridges, Best Original Screenplay and Best Film Editing. The film received three nominations at British Academy Film Awards, including Best Actor in a Supporting Role for Bridges, Best Original Screenplay and Best Cinematography. The film received six nominations at  Critics' Choice Awards, including Best Picture, Best Director, Best Supporting Actor for Bridges and Foster, Best Acting Ensemble and Best Original Screenplay. The film received three nominations at Golden Globe Awards, including Best Motion Picture – Drama, Best Supporting Actor – Motion Picture for Bridges and Best Screenplay. The film won Best Supporting Actor for Bridges and nominated for Best Film and Best Original Screenplay at Satellite Awards.

Accolades

Notes

References

External links 
 

Lists of accolades by film